Leionema oldfieldii is a small shrub that is endemic to mountainous locations in Tasmania, Australia. It has dark green leaves, compact pale pink to white flowers from November to January.

Description
The branchlets are more or less needle-shaped, with usually star to upright shaped soft hairs. The stamens are slightly longer than the petals. Flowering occurs from late spring to early summer.

Taxonomy
This species was first formally described in 1858 by Ferdinand von Mueller and gave it the name Eriostemon oldfieldii and the description was published in Fragmenta Phytographiae Australiae.  In 1998 Paul G. Wilson changed the name to Leionema oldfieldii and the name change was published in the journal Nuytsia.

Distribution and habitat
Leionema oldfieldii  grows in mountainous areas of the south and west coasts of Tasmania.

References

oldfieldii
Sapindales of Australia
Flora of Tasmania
Taxa named by Ferdinand von Mueller